The following article is a summary of the 2019–20 football season in Belgium, which was the 117th season of competitive football in the country and ran from July 2019 until August 2020.

National teams

Belgium national football team 

After starting with four wins out of four during the previous season, Belgium continued its stroll through UEFA Euro 2020 qualifying Group I, also winning all remaining six matches and thereby qualifying for UEFA Euro 2020 with a perfect record. The tournament itself was however postponed to 2021 due to the COVID-19 pandemic in Europe. and both the preparation matches against Portugal and Switzerland in March which were to be held in Qatar as well as two other matches in June against opponents which were still to be announced, were cancelled.

UEFA Euro 2020 qualifying

UEFA Euro 2020
Belgium was to play Denmark, Finland and Russia in Group B in June 2020, however all matches were postponed to 2021.

Friendlies
Four friendlies were to be played in preparation for the UEFA Euro 2020 tournament, the first two would have been played in March in Qatar against Portugal and Switzerland, while the two others were scheduled for June, with the opponents still unknown. Eventually, all matches were cancelled due to the COVID-19 pandemic in Europe.

Belgium women's national football team 

Qualification for the UEFA Women's Euro 2021 started perfect for the Belgians with four straight wins, with also Switzerland holding the maximum after four games. A few weeks before the crucial match between the joint-leaders, all remaining matches were postponed to the following season, due to the COVID-19 pandemic in Europe. The UEFA Women's Euro 2021 tournament was pushed back a year to become the UEFA Women's Euro 2021, to avoid coinciding with both the 2020 Summer Olympics and UEFA Euro 2020. Meanwhile, the team did compete in the 2020 Algarve Cup, reaching 6th place out of 8 teams, while two other friendlies were cancelled.

UEFA Women's Euro 2021 qualifying

Friendlies

Belgium national under-21 football team 

The U21 started their 2021 UEFA European Under-21 Championship qualifying campaign and were scheduled to play their first five matches. However the final match against Bosnia-Herzegovina was postponed to the following season due to COVID-19.

2021 UEFA European Under-21 Championship qualification

Belgium national under-19 football team 

The U19 took part in the 2020 UEFA European Under-19 Championship qualifying campaign. The team easily passed the qualifying round, moving into the elite round, before the tournament was cancelled entirely and qualification was stopped.

2020 UEFA European Under-19 Championship qualification

Qualifying round

Elite Round

Friendlies

Men's football

League season

Promotion and relegation
The following teams had achieved promotion or suffered relegation going into the 2019–20 season.

Coronavirus impact & License troubles
Due to the COVID-19 pandemic in Belgium, all professional matches were postponed mid-March. A few weeks later the board of directors of the Belgian Pro League proposed to cancel permanently all remaining matches, take the standings as of March 12 counting as final and award the title to Club Brugge, with the proposal to be accepted at the general meeting on 15 May 2020. UEFA criticized the decision to stop the competition early, threatening to not allow any Belgian clubs to take part in the 2020–21 UEFA Champions League and 2020–21 UEFA Europa League unless they tried everything possible to complete as many matches as possible before the extended deadline of early August. In the amateur leagues, all remaining matches were canceled as well, and points of teams that had played fewer matches were scaled up before completing the final standings, while all playoff matches were canceled and only direct promotions and relegations were carried out.

Despite stopping all matches in both the 2019–20 Belgian First Division A and 2019–20 Belgian First Division B, several unresolved issues remain, which were to be solved by a group of experts to come with a proposal by mid-May: 
 Which team will relegate from the Belgian First Division A? Last place Waasland-Beveren was only two points behind Oostende and thus mathematically had a chance to avoid relegation with one match to play.
 Which team will promote from the Belgian First Division B? Period champions Oud-Heverlee Leuven and Beerschot should have played a two-legged promotion playoff to determine the champion, but had only completed the first leg at the time the outbreak occurred. 
 What to do with the 2020 Belgian Cup Final? Club Brugge and Antwerp were to play the final on 22 March 2020. 
The easiest solution would involve having no relegation and allowing both Oud-Heverlee Leuven and Beerschot to be promoted, playing one season with 18 teams without playoffs. Meanwhile, the 2020 Belgian Super Cup (scheduled to be played towards the end of July) could be canceled, with the cup final to be played on that date instead. While many clubs seemed to support this proposal, no final consensus was reached in the months of March and April, as the general meeting was postponed several times.

To complicate matters further, on 8 April 2020, the license commission decided not to award a professional football license to no less than seven (of 24) professional clubs, nearly always for insufficient proof of financial solvency. This included three teams from the 2019–20 Belgian First Division A (Standard Liège, Excel Mouscron and Oostende) and four from the 2019–20 Belgian First Division B (Lokeren, Lommel, Roeselare and Virton). All seven clubs appealed the decision at the Belgian Court for Sports Arbitrage, but only Standard Liège, Excel Mouscron, Oostende, and Lommel were awarded a license while Lokeren went bankrupt and ceased to exist and both Roeselare and Virton were refused a license and thereby forced to relegate. As a result, there are only 21 professional teams left, meaning more than just one team will need to be promoted from the 2019–20 Belgian First Amateur Division. In that division, only had two teams received a professional football license (Deinze and RWDM47) at first instance, but eventually, the appeals of Seraing and Lierse Kempenzonen were upheld, meaning there are four eligible teams.

In the days before the decision by the general meeting, several clubs sent around their proposal with their vision on how the season should come to an end, with opinions differing hugely:
 On 10 May 2020, league leaders Club Brugge (who are against the playoff system) proposed to stop the season with the standings as final. Waasland-Beveren would be spared of relegation while both Beerschot and OH Leuven would be promoted and the 2020–21 Belgian First Division A would thus be played with 18 teams, without playoffs. In their proposal, the cup final would be played on 1 or 2 August and newly signed players would be allowed.
 On 11 May 2020, Standard Liège (who would prefer keeping the playoff system) reacted by stating that there needed to be consistency in the decisions and it would be unfair to declare a champion but have no relegation. Hence they insisted Waasland-Beveren be relegated and the promotion play-off between Beerschot and OH Leuven to be played without supporters and if needed at a neutral venue to decide the promoting team. The club also hoped the Belgian Cup final could still be completed before the end of the season.
 On 12 May 2020, Genk agreed to extend the league to 18 teams (as per the proposal of Club Brugge), but also proposed to create a new playoff system, in which after completion of the regular season, the top four teams playoff for the title while teams five through eight play off for the remaining European ticket.  In case the coronavirus reemerges, they propose to end the season after 34 matchdays and take those standings as final. They also insist that the current league format should be reinstated as from the 2021–22 season, meaning there would be three teams relegating from the 2020–21 Belgian First Division A. Genk also stated that in case there would be no agreement to stop the current season (80% of votes needed), to declare the current season void (50% of votes needed), which would imply no champion, no relegations and promotions.
 On 14 May 2020, in preparation for the general meeting of the next day, the group of experts came to a new proposal to be approved at the general meeting, which involved canceling all remaining matches, taking the standings as final with Club Brugge crowned as champions. The 2020–21 Belgian First Division A season will have shortened playoffs, but most importantly will still contain 16 teams, meaning that Waasland-Beveren would be relegated. To determine the team to be promoted, Oud-Heverlee Leuven and Beerschot need to attempt to play the return leg of the promotion playoff. If they cannot complete the match before the deadline, Westerlo would be promoted instead as the team which obtained the most points during the regular season. There will also be an attempt to complete the 2020 Belgian Cup Final before the deadline of August 3 as set by UEFA.

Belgian First Division A

Regular season

Belgian First Division B

Belgian First Amateur Division

Belgian Second Amateur Division

Division A

Division B

Division C

Belgian Third Amateur Division

Division A

Division B

Division C

Division D

Cup competitions

Transfers

UEFA competitions
Champions Genk qualified directly for the group stage of the Champions League, while runners-up Club Brugge started in the qualifying rounds. Cup winners KV Mechelen were banned from European football after being found guilty of match-fixing as part of the 2017–19 Belgian football fraud scandal, resulting in their place in the group stage of the Europa League being taken by Standard Liège for finishing third in the league. Finally Antwerp and Gent started in the UEFA Europa League qualifying rounds after respectively finishing fourth and fifth.

European qualification for 2020–21 summary

Managerial changes
This is a list of changes of managers within Belgian professional league football:

First Division A

First Division B

Notes

See also
 2019–20 Belgian First Division A
 2019–20 Belgian First Division B
 2019–20 Belgian First Amateur Division
 2019–20 Belgian Second Amateur Division
 2019–20 Belgian Third Amateur Division
 2019–20 Belgian Cup
 2019 Belgian Super Cup

References

 
Belgium
Belgium